Anne Marie Cyr (born 1963) is a French Canadian singer, TV presenter and occasional model; who was active during the early 1980s. Born and raised in Montreal, Quebec, Canada, Cyr came to prominence in her late teens on Montreal cable television assisting and presenting on shows such as Musi-Video (a forerunner to Canada's MuchMusic). She fitted in her TV presenting and pop career with studying communications at Montreal's Concordia University.

While working at Musi-Video, she was asked to provide female backing vocals for the synthpop band Nudimension who were appearing on the show.

Originally selected to appear with Nudimension mainly for her good looks, it would soon become apparent to band founders Louis Rondeau and Marc Fontaine that Cyr was also a very competent, bilingual vocalist, and she was retained to work on the band's two albums (one in French and the other in English).

She would go on to become the band's most prominent female vocalist; although she was never considered a permanent member of the band, Cyr is synonymous with Nudimension.

In early 1983, Nudimension released the francophone single "Amour Programmé" which was a synthpop duet between band founder Louis Rondeau (former drummer for the 222s) and Cyr. Released on the Saisons label principally in Quebec, it became a minor hit in the francophone regions of Canada; and by export in France and remaining North America. Cyr and Rondeau appeared together on the Canadian network TV show Lautrec '83 (presented by Donald Lautrec) to promote the single, her highest-profile TV performance. She also appeared on CFCF-TV on Friday night's Nite Life presented by Peter King, representing Nudimension.

Four other singles followed, including "Big Boy" and "Hors la loi (Anne Marie version)" which both featured Cyr on lead vocals and acted as a clear demonstration of her vocal range in both languages.

But without the commercial success that "Amour Programmé" achieved, and the fact that manager Ben Kaye preferred to devote more time to his other 1983 signing, the then little known Celine Dion, Nudimension floundered; and beyond 1986 Cyr did not work with the band further. Nudimension itself would eventually stop recording around 1990.

Cyr continues to live in Montreal, but no longer works in the media. The majority of Cyr's work with Nudimension is featured on their 2009 greatest hits album The Best of Nudimension.

Discography
Cyr only ever recorded with Nudimension and is listed as a "special guest" on record sleeves. She was Nudimension's principal female vocalist and appears in the following releases:

 "Amour Programmé" – 1983 (Fr)
 "Obsession" – 1983 (Fr)
 "Rendezvous" – 1983 (En)
 "Hors la loi" – 1984 (Fr)
 "Big Boy" – 1984 (En)

References

External links
 2011 Short Documentary on Anne-Marie Cyr 
Article on the formation of Nudimension 

Date of birth missing (living people)
1963 births
Living people
French Quebecers
Canadian new wave musicians
French-language singers of Canada
Women new wave singers
Cyr, Anne Marie
Singers from Montreal